Steven Kyle Waldrop (born October 27, 1985) is an American former professional baseball pitcher. He played in Major League Baseball (MLB) for the Minnesota Twins.

Career
Kyle Waldrop was the Twins' third pick in the first round of the 2004 Major League Baseball draft, when the Twins had five first-round picks. He was the 25th player drafted that year.

A native of Knoxville, Tennessee and a 2004 graduate of Farragut High School in Farragut, Tennessee, Waldrop has played for Twins minor-league teams in Elizabethton, Tennessee, Beloit, Wisconsin, Fort Myers, Florida, New Britain, Connecticut, and Rochester, New York.

Waldrop missed the entire 2008 season due to a shoulder injury.

In 2011, he was one of six pitchers not on the Twins' major league roster to be invited to the team's spring training camp in Fort Myers.

On September 5, 2011, Waldrop was called up from Rochester with Brian Dinkelman.

In January 2013, Waldrop signed with the Pittsburgh Pirates.

References

External links

1985 births
Living people
Baseball players from Knoxville, Tennessee
Major League Baseball pitchers
Minnesota Twins players
Gulf Coast Twins players
Elizabethton Twins players
Beloit Snappers players
Fort Myers Miracle players
New Britain Rock Cats players
Rochester Red Wings players
Peoria Saguaros players
Indianapolis Indians players
Farragut High School alumni